The 1989–90 Chicago Blackhawks season was the Hawks' 64th season. The season involved winning the Norris Division.

Offseason
The Blackhawks brought 1970s Soviet star goaltender Vladislav Tretiak to Chicago to help improve their netminders.  The biggest offseason trade was a September 1990 deal sending Steve Ludzik to the Sabres for goalie Jacques Cloutier.

NHL Draft
Chicago's draft picks at the 1989 NHL Entry Draft held at the Met Center in Bloomington, Minnesota.

Regular season
The Blackhawks would play consistent hockey all season as they win the Norris Division with a record of 41-33-6. 

Offensively, Steve Larmer again led the team with 59 assists and 90 points. Steve Thomas led the team in goals with 40.  Dennis Savard was second in points with 80 and assists with 53.  Jeremey Roenick finished his first full year with 26 goals and 40 assists for 66 points. Doug Wilson had an outstanding year with 23 goals, 50 assists for a team third-best 73 points. Dave Manson was again second-highest defenseman in scoring with 28 points. On November 2, 1989, Doug Wilson scored just 18 seconds into the overtime period to give the Blackhawks a 4-3 home win over the Minnesota North Stars. It would prove to be the fastest overtime goal scored during the 1989-90 NHL regular season.

In goal, while Alain Chevrier took the Blackhawks to the Conference finals the year before, his 16-14-3 record and 4.18 Goals Against Average in 89-90 got him traded in March 1990. Jacques Cloutier who was acquired just before the season began, was the primary goaltender with an 18-15-2 record and a 3.09 Goals Against Average. In March, the Blackhawks acquired Greg Millen from Quebec, and he began to take over in the nets at the end of the season with a 5-4-1 record. Eddie Belfour could not make the Hawks roster and instead spent six months with the Canadian national team.

Final standings

Schedule and results

Player stats

Regular season
Scoring

Goaltending

Playoffs
After reaching the Conference finals the year before, hopes were high entering the playoffs. The first round reunited the Hawks with their old rivals, the Minnesota North Stars for the first time since their four-year consecutive playoff match streak ended in 1985. The playoff format had changed since then, and now featured a seven-game series. The Blackhawks would barely survive this seven game war with the fourth place Minnesota North Stars. The Hawks defeated the North Stars four games to three with the Hawks outscoring Minnesota by a total of three goals over the series.

The second round Norris Division Finals, saw the Blackhawks pitted against the St. Louis Blues. The Blackhawks again needed all seven games to advance. In a bold move, coach Mike Keenan decided to start Ed Belfour, who was recently recalled from the minors, in net in three of the games, and Eddie the Eagle won all three. The first six games were decided by one or two goals each, and game seven in Chicago was set for another close battle, however after Jeremy Roenick gave the Hawks a 2-0 first period lead, the Blues went on a powerplay only to have Steve Larmer score a demoralizing shorthanded goal, and the rout was on - resulting in 8-2 victory.  The Blackhawks were again headed to the conference finals against the Edmonton Oilers. Unlike their previous playoff loses to Edmonton, this time the Oilers were without Wayne Gretzky.) 

The Western Conference Finals saw Keenan go back to Millen and Cloutier in the nets with Belfour only appearing in the first game despite his 2.49 goals against average. After splitting the first two in the Edmonton, the Hawks took the first home game at the Chicago Stadium to take a 2-1 series lead. However, the Oilers won the next three to win the series, and went on to win the Stanley Cup.

Scoring

Goaltending

Note: Pos = Position; GP = Games played; G = Goals; A = Assists; Pts = Points; +/- = plus/minus; PIM = Penalty minutes; PPG = Power-play goals; SHG = Short-handed goals; GWG = Game-winning goals
      MIN = Minutes played; W = Wins; L = Losses; T = Ties; GA = Goals-against; GAA = Goals-against average; SO = Shutouts; SA = Shots against; SV = Shots saved; SV% = Save percentage;

References
Blackhawks on Hockey Database

Chicago Blackhawks seasons
Chicago Blackhawks season, 1989-90
Norris Division champion seasons
Chicago
Chicago Blackhawks
Chicago Blackhawks
1980s in Chicago
1989 in Illinois